Idris Bazorkin (1910–1993) was a North Caucasian writer and poet whom many consider to be the founder of modern Ingush literature. His major work is the novel Dark Ages (Iz t’my vekov, 1968).

Bibliography
 “Iz t’my vekov.” [1968] In Sobranie sochinenii, vol. 1 and 2, edited by Ia. Patiev. Magas, Ingushetia: Serdalo, 2001–2.

Translations into English
 Idris Bazorkin, novel excerpt, First Lines 2 (2013): 43-49 (British Centre for Lit. Translation). 	
 Idris Bazorkin, “Evening Prayers” in The Russia Reader: Culture, History, Politics, eds. Bruce Grant and Adele Barker (Durham, NC: Duke University Press, 2010), 293–302.  
 Idris Bazorkin, “Light of the Ancestors,” Washington Square 27 (2010): 152–167.

References 

 Bazorkin, Aza. Vospominaniia ob ottse. Nalchik: El’-fa, 2001.
 Gould, Rebecca Ruth. “Enchanting Literary Modernity: Idris Bazorkin’s Postcolonial Soviet Pastoral,” Modern Language Review 15.2 (2020): 405–428.
 Gould, Rebecca Ruth. “Finding Bazorkin: A Journey from Anthropology to Literature,” Anthropology and Humanism 41.1 (2016): 86-101.
 Kharsieva, Liliia. Spetsifika ingushskoi kul’tury: esteticheskie i dukhovno-nravstvennye osnovy romana I. Bazorkina “Iz t’my vekov.” Nazran: Piligrim, 2007.

Ingush people
1910 births
1993 deaths
Soviet male poets
Place of birth missing
Soviet writers